Bonita may refer to:

Music
 "Bonita" (Antônio Carlos Jobim song), 1963
 "Bonita", a song by J Balvin, 2017
 "Bonita", a song by Juanes and Sebastián Yatra, 2019

Places

Turkey
 Bonita (Paphlagonia), an ancient town

United States
 Bonita, Arizona
 Bonita, California, in San Diego County
 Bonita, Madera County, California
 Bonita, Kansas
 Bonita, Louisiana
 Bonita, Oregon
 Bonita, Texas
 Bonita, Washington
 Bonita, Wisconsin
 Bonita Avenue, in Baltimore County, Maryland
 Bonita Canyon, in the Chiricahua Mountains, Arizona
 Bonita Channel, a shipping channel in Marin County, California
 Bonita Creek, a stream in Orange County, California
 Bonita Falls, a set of waterfalls in California

Schools
 Bonita Elementary School District, Graham County, Arizona
 Bonita Unified School District, Los Angeles County, California
 Bonita High School, La Verne, California

Ships
 Bonita (1900 sternwheeler), a steamboat in Oregon, U.S.
 USS Bonita, various ships and submarines of the United States Navy

Other uses
 Bonita (fish), or little tunny, a species of tuna
 Bonita (name), including a list of people with the name
 Bonita BPM, an open-source business process management and development platform

See also

 
 Bonito (disambiguation)
 Bonata (disambiguation)